Joe Gallivan (born August 9, 1937, Rochester, New York) is an American jazz and avant-garde musician.  He plays drums, percussion and synthesizer.

Career
Gallivan's first professional experience came at the age of 15 while in Miami. He played early on with Eduardo Chavez, Art Mooney and Charlie Spivak, as well as with the Modern Jazz Orchestra. He attended the University of Miami and then moved to New York in 1961, where he had a big band with Donald Byrd that featured Eric Dolphy, Pepper Adams, Don Ellis, Johnny Coles, Julius Watkins, and Duke Pearson. During the next year, he returned to Miami, conducted for the TV show Music U.S.A., and led the band A Train of Thought. In the 1960s he became interested in electronic music and musique concrète and began meeting with Vladimir Ussachevsky. He helped test the drum system developed by Robert Moog which Gallivan used on the 1974 Gil Evans album There Comes a Time.

Gallivan worked in the 1970s with saxophonist Charles Austin and three years with Larry Young in their band Love Cry Want. ("Love Cry Want" is also the title of the group's 1972 recording that was released in 1997 by Gallivan's label Newjazz). Gallivan moved to Europe in 1976. In London he was considered a replacement for Robert Wyatt in the band Soft Machine but did not end up joining the group, instead collaborating with its former members Elton Dean and Hugh Hopper. They formed a quartet with Keith Tippett for the 1976–77 albums Cruel but Fair and Mercy Dash. While living in Frankfurt in the 1980s, Gallivan worked with Albert Mangelsdorff, Heinz Sauer, and Christoph Lauer.

In 1989 Gallivan returned to the U.S., living in Hawaii. In London he recorded the album Innocence with Elton Dean and Evan Parker. He performed at Ronnie Scott's Club in London with Brian Cuomo on piano and Jackie Ryan on vocals. In 1998, Gallivan recorded Electric/Electronic/Electric in the trio Powerfield with keyboardist Pat Thomas and guitarist Gary Smith and Gallivan/Smith with Gary Smith. During the same year he recorded Des del silenci in Barcelona with the Ektal Ensemble, including trumpeter Benet Palet, percussionist Marti Perramon, and Gnawan quartet Nas Marrakech featuring vocalist Abdel-Jahlil Koddsi. In 2000 he performed at the Bell Atlantic Jazz Festival in New York City in his band the Rainforest Initiative with Dean, Parker, Charles Austin, John McMinn, Marcio Mattos, Lei'ohu Ryder, and Mahalani Po'epo'e. This performance was recorded and broadcast on the Black Entertainment Network.

He recorded the live album Vienna with bassist Paul Rogers and Indian violinist Anupriya Deotale and LA with Benn Clatworthy. In 2011 Gallivan was the sole surviving member of the 1970s band Love Cry Want. He recorded a new Love Cry Want album with guitarist Tom McNalley and bassist Michelle Webb.

Discography 

 Modern Jazz Orchestra featuring Kenny Drew, Joe Gallivan, Don Vincent (Addess) (re-issued on CD in 2001 by V.S.O.P. Records)
 At Last (Man Made) Charles Austin, Joe Gallivan (released as CD in 2000)
 Mindscapes (Spitball) Charles Austin, Joe Gallivan (released as CD in 2000)
 Expressions to the Winds (Spitball) Charles Austin, Joe Gallivan (also CD in 2000)
 Cruel But Fair (Compendium) with Hugh Hopper, Elton Dean, Keith Tippet, Joe Gallivan (reissued on CD by One Way)
 Peace on Earth (Compendium) with Charles Austin, Joe Gallivan, John McMinn, Carmen Lundy, David Deluca, Al Richardson, Marvis Martin, London
 Intercontinental Express with Joe Gallivan, Charles Austin, Kenny Wheeler, Nick Evans, Jeff Green, Elton Dean, Ronnie Scott, Ian Hamer, Roy Babbington, Toni Cook, Stephen Wick.
 The Cheque Is in the Mail (Ogun) Kenny Wheeler, Elton Dean, Joe Gallivan
 Home from Home (Ogun) Charles Austin, Roy Babbington, Joe Gallivan
 Mercy Dash (Atmospheres) Hugh Hopper, Elton Dean, Keith Tippet, Joe Gallivan (reissued on CD by Culture Press)
 There Comes a Time (RCA) Gil Evans and his Orchestra
 And Around (Colin) Jean Schwarz, Charles Austin, Joe Gallivan
 Surroundings (Celia) Jean Schwarz, Charles Austin, Joe Gallivan
 Miami (Atmosphere) Charles Austin, Joe Gallivan
 The New Orchestra (Hannibal) Charles Austin, Joe Gallivan, Ryo Kawasaki, Clive Stevens, Peter Ponzol, George Bishop, Gene Golden, Sabu Morales, Wendell Hayes, Tadashi Yasunaga
 Voices (Hannibal) Joe Gallivan, Charles Austin, John McMinn, Earl Lloyd
 Supply and Demand (Rykodisc) Dagmar Krause, Richard Thompson, John Harle, Danny Thompson, Joe Gallivan
 Mysterious Planet (Hannibal) Charles Austin, Joe Gallivan, John McMinn, Nelson Padron, Earl Lloyd
 Prism (Vinyl) Peter Ponzol, Abbey Rader, Joe Gallivan
 Innocence (Cadence) Joe Gallivan with Guy Barker, Elton Dean, Claude Deppa, Jim Dvorak, Marcio Mattos, Neil Metcalf, Evan Parker, Gerard Presencer, Paul Rutherford, Ashley Slater
 Night Vision (Newjazz.com) Brian Cuomo, Joe Gallivan
 The Origin of Man (Newjazz.com) Elton Dean, Brian Cuomo, Joe Gallivan
 Surrender (newjazz.com) Jackie Ryan, Brian Cuomo, Joe Gallivan
 Love Cry Want (newjazz.com) Larry Young, Joe Gallivan, Nicholas
 Orchestral Meditations (newjazz.com) Charles Austin, Joe Gallivan, John McMinn
 Timeless (newjazz.com) Charles Austin, Joe Gallivan, John McMinn, Gene Argel, Brian Cuomo, Hector Serrano
 Guitars on Mars (Virgin) Larry Young, Nicholas, Joe Gallivan
 Wiretapper (November 1998), Powerfield (Joe Gallivan, Gary Smith, Pat Thomas)
 Des del silenci (Afro-Blue) Ektal Ensemble
 Electronic/Electric/Electronic (Paratactile) Powerfield (Joe Gallivan, Gary Smith, Pat Thomas)
 Joe Gallivan/Gary Smith (Paratactile) Joe Gallivan, Gary Smith
 Live at Ronnie Scott's (Ronnie Scott's) Joe Gallivan, Jackie Ryan, Brian Cuomo
 Powerfield (2006) Powerfield (Joe Gallivan, Gary Smith, Pat Thomas)
 Vienna (2007) Rainforest Initiative (Joe Gallivan, Paul Rogers, Anupriya)
 LA (2010) Joe Gallivan, Benn Clatworthy
 Neon Lighthouse 84 (2010) Joe Gallivan, Tony Moore (aka P.Y. Caplin)
 Love Cry Want - Lizard Below (2011) Joe Gallivan, Tom McNalley, Michelle Webb
 Europe (2014) Joe Gallivan with Charles Austin, Elton Dean, Pat Thomas, Gary Smith, Jim Dvorak, Claude Deppa, Guy Barker
 New Morning for the World (2021) Joe Gallivan, Brian Cuomo, John Zangrando

Radio broadcasts 
 1977 Chateau Vallon Festival in Toulon, France: Intercontinental Express Big Band
 1977 Danish Radio: Live at Club Montmartre
 1977 Radio Bremen: Live at Stadt Theatre in Bremen
 1977 Radio France: Recorded broadcast with Charles Austin
 1977 Radio France: Two sessions with Elton Dean, Keith Tippett, and Hugh Hopper
 1978 Espace Cardin: Live broadcast with Charles Austin and big band from Paris
 1980 Radio France: two broadcasts with French composer Jean Schwarz and Charles Austin
 1981 France Musique: Live broadcast
 1982 France Musique: Live broadcast with Peter Ponzol
 1983 Hessischer Rundfunk Jazz Ensemble broadcast
 1985 BBC Radio 3: with Elton Dean
 1985 Hessischer Rundfunk Jazz Ensemble broadcast
 1986 BBC Radio 3: Soldiers of the Road Big Band
 1986 BBC Radio 3: with John Corbett
 1986 Hessischer Rundfunk Jazz Ensemble broadcast with John Schroeder
 1987 BBC Radio 3: duo with Evan Parker
 1987 France Musique with Nicholas
 1987 Public TV, Miami, Florida: One hour show with Charles Austin
 1992 BBC Radio 1: Quartet with Paul Rutherford, Jim Dvorak, Marcio Mattos
 1992 BBC Radio 1: Soldiers of the Road Big Band at the London Jazz Festival
 2000 BBC Radio 3: Powerfield (Joe Gallivan, Gary Smith, Pat Thomas)
 2000 Black Entertainment Network broadcasts the Rainforest Initiative
 2001 ORF radio (Vienna): Ektal Ensemble at Festival Schnittpunkte
 2003 ORF television (Vienna): Joe Gallivan and DJ Orgasmus
 2004 Orange Internet Radio (Austria): Rainforest 21

References 

Nathan Bush, [ Joe Gallivan] at Allmusic

External links 
 Joe Gallivan's homepage
 Interview with Joe Gallivan by Dave Segal in The Stranger (Seattle) May 26, 2016 

American jazz drummers
Living people
Cadence Jazz Records artists
1937 births
20th-century American drummers
American male drummers
20th-century American male musicians
American male jazz musicians